Mojado Power is a 1981 Mexican comedy film directed by and starring Alfonso Arau. The film was selected as the Mexican entry for the Best Foreign Language Film at the 54th Academy Awards, but was not accepted as a nominee.

Cast
 Alfonso Arau as Nato Solís
 Blanca Guerra as Xochitl
 Pedro Damián as Joe
 Priscilla Garcia as Tina
 Nono Arsu as Jacobo
 Socorro Bonilla as Daisy

See also
 List of submissions to the 54th Academy Awards for Best Foreign Language Film
 List of Mexican submissions for the Academy Award for Best Foreign Language Film

References

External links
 

1981 films
1981 comedy films
1980s Spanish-language films
Mexican comedy films
Films directed by Alfonso Arau
1980s Mexican films